According to the Political Constitution of the Free and Sovereign State of Chihuahua, Executive Power in that Mexican state resides with a single individual, the Constitutional Governor of the Free and Sovereign State of Chihuahua, who is chosen for a period of six years and cannot for any reason be re-elected. The term of governor begins on October 4 of the year of the election and finishes on October 3 after six years have elapsed. Gubernatorial elections are held two years prior to presidential elections.

The state of Chihuahua was created on July 6, 1824, as one of the original states of the federation recognized by the 1824 Constitution. It has survived through all the different systems of government Mexico has had, both the federal system and the central system, and so its status has changed between that of a state and a department; along with that, the denomination of the holder of the executive power also changed.

In order to be elected, the Governor must be under the Constitution of Mexico a Mexican citizen by birth, not less than 30 years of age, and a native or resident of Chihuahua for at least 5 years prior to inauguration.

Current holder, María Eugenia Campos Galván, became on September 8, 2021 the first woman to ever serve as Governor of the state of Chihuahua.

Governors of the Province of Chihuahua (1823-1824)

Governors of the Free and Sovereign State of Chihuahua (1824–Today)

References

External links
 List of governors of Chihuahua  .

Chihuaha